Aird and Loch Ness is one of the 21 wards used to elect members of the Highland Council.  It includes Loch Ness, the town of Beauly, and the village of Fort Augustus. It elects four Councillors.

Councillors

Election Results

2022 election

2021 by-election
A by-election was originally scheduled to take place on 5 November 2020 to elect one councillor after the death of George Cruickshank. However, it was postponed to 11 March 2021.

2017 Election

2015 by-election
A by-election was triggered by the resignation of Drew Hendry in July 2015, following his election as an MP.

2012 Election

2007 Election

2003 Election

Prior to 2007, council elections used single member wards with a first-past-the-post voting system. The current boundaries for Aird and Loch Ness mainly include the 1999-2007 wards of Loch Ness West, Loch Ness East, Beauly and Strathglass and Kirkhill. A large part of the old Inverness West ward is also included. Seven other old wards overlap with Aird and Loch Ness, but the vast majority of their areas lie outside the present boundary.

Wards almost entirely contained within Aird and Loch Ness

Wards with a significant portion in Aird and Loch Ness

1999 Election

Prior to 2007, council elections used single member wards with a first-past-the-post voting system. The current boundaries for Aird and Loch Ness mainly include the 1999-2007 wards of Loch Ness West, Loch Ness East, Beauly and Strathglass and Kirkhill. A large part of the old Inverness West ward is also included. Seven other old wards overlap with Aird and Loch Ness, but the vast majority of their areas lie outside the present boundary.

Wards almost entirely contained within Aird and Loch Ness

 
 

 
 

¹For previous Kirkhill ward boundary

 
 

²For Drumnadrochit ward

 

³For East Loch Ness ward

Wards with a significant portion in Aird and Loch Ness

1995 Election

Prior to 2007, council elections used single member wards with a first-past-the-post voting system. The current boundaries for Aird and Loch Ness mainly include the 1995 wards of Beauly, Drumnadrochit, Kirkhill, Fort Augustus and East Loch Ness. Large parts of the Scorguie and Strathnairn and Strathdearn wards are also included. Five other old wards overlap with Aird and Loch Ness, but the vast majority of their areas lie outside the present boundary.

Wards almost entirely contained within Aird and Loch Ness

Wards with a significant portion in Aird and Loch Ness

References

Highland council wards
Loch Ness